Eduardo Henrique Bernardo de Oliveira (born 26 September 1982), known as Eduardo Zuma, is a Brazilian football coach.

Career
Born in Leme, São Paulo, Zuma worked in the scouting areas before being named Guilherme Alves' assistant at Portuguesa in 2017. In 2018, he joined Fernando Diniz's staff at Atlético Paranaense.

Zuma followed Diniz to São Paulo and Santos, always as his assistant. He was also an interim manager of the latter club on two occasions, against former side Athletico (2–1 home win) and Fortaleza (1–1 away draw), both when Diniz was suspended.

Managerial statistics

References

External links

1982 births
Living people
Sportspeople from São Paulo (state)
Brazilian football managers
Santos FC non-playing staff
Campeonato Brasileiro Série A managers
Santos FC managers
People from Leme, São Paulo